Ferenc Hüll ( Prekmurje Slovene: Ferenc Hül) (August 28, 1800 – October 28, 1880) was a Slovene Roman Catholic priest, dean of the Slovene March (Tótság), and a writer in Hungary.

Hüll was born in Tišina (now Prekmurje, Slovenia). His parents were Imre Hüll and the ethnic German Krisztina Hemeczperger. By 1822 he was a priest, and he lived in Veszprém for two years.

Between 1824 and 1826 he was a curate in Murska Sobota, and he later became the priest of the town. By 1840 he was the dean of the Slovene March. In 1872, by favour of Franz Joseph I of Austria, he became the provost of Szepes-Langeck.

Hüll wrote in Latin about the history of the Parish of Murska Sobota. He died in Murska Sobota.

Work 
 Historia Parochiae Murai Szombatiensis

See also 
 Hungarian Slovenes
 List of Slovene writers and poets in Hungary

1800 births
1880 deaths
Slovenian writers and poets in Hungary
19th-century Slovenian Roman Catholic priests
People from Tišina